The 2021–22 season is Queen of the South's ninth consecutive season in the second tier of Scottish football, the Scottish Championship, having been promoted as champions from the Scottish Second Division at the end of the 2012–13 season. Queens are also competing in the Challenge Cup, League Cup and the Scottish Cup.

Summary
Queens finished tenth in the Scottish Championship and were relegated to Scottish League One, ending nine straight seasons in Scottish Football's second tier. 

Queens reached the 2022 Scottish Challenge Cup Final, ending runners-up to Raith Rovers, losing 3-1 at the Excelsior Stadium, Airdrie. 

The Doonhamers were knocked out after the first round of the League Cup after the completion of fixtures in Group F that included Airdrieonians, Annan Athletic, Motherwell and Queen's Park.

Queens reached the third round of the Scottish Cup, losing 3-0 at Palmerston to Cove Rangers in a replay, after a 2-2 draw at the Balmoral Stadium.

Results and fixtures

Pre season

Scottish Championship

Scottish League Cup

Scottish Challenge Cup

Scottish Cup

Player statistics

Captains

|-
 
|-

|-

Squad 

|}

Disciplinary record

Top scorers
Last updated 30 April 2022

Clean sheets

{| class="wikitable" style="font-size: 95%; text-align: center"
|-
!width=15|
!width=15|
!width=15|
!width=150|Name
!width=80|Scottish Championship
!width=80|League Cup
!width=80|Challenge Cup
!width=80|Scottish Cup
!width=80|Total
|-
|1
|GK
|
|Josh Rae
|3
|0
|1
|0
|4
|-
|12
|GK
|
|Sol Brynn
|5
|0
|2
|0
|7
|-
!colspan="4"|Total !! 8 !! 0 !! 3 !! 0 !! 11

Team statistics

Scottish Championship

League table

Results by round

League Cup table

Management statistics
Last updated 30 April 2022

Transfers

Players in

Players out

See also
List of Queen of the South F.C. seasons

Notes

References

Queen of the South F.C. seasons
Queen of the South